Aboriginal communities in Western Australia are built communities for indigenous Australians within their ancestral country; the communities comprise families with continuous links to country that extend before the European settlement of Australia.

A
Ardyaloon

B
 Badjaling Community
Balgo
Barrel Well Community
Bayulu Community
Beagle Bay Community
Bell Springs Community
Bidan Community
Bidyadanga Community
 Bilinue Community
 Bilgungurr Community
 Bindi Bindi Community
 Blackstone see  Papulankutja
Bobieding Community
Bondini community
 Brunbrunganjal Community
Burringurrah Community
Buttah Windee Community

C
 Cheeditha Community
Coonana
Cosmo Newbery
 Cotton Creek Community
 Crocodile Hole Community
Cundeelee

D
Djarindjin Community
Djugerari Community

F
Four Mile Community
 Frazier Downs Community

G
Ganinyi Community
 Gidgee Gully Community
Gilaroong Community
Girriyoowa Community
 Gooda Binya Community
Goolarabooloo Millibinyarri Community
Guda Guda Community
Gulgagulganeng community

I
Ilkulka Community
Imintji Community
Innawonga Community
Iragul Community
 Irrungadji Community

J
 Jameson Community
Jarlmadangah Burru Community
Jigalong Community
Jimbalakudunj Community
Jimbilum Community
Joy Springs Community
 Jundaru community
Junjuwa community

K
Kadjina Community
Kalumburu
Kandiwal community
Karalundi Community
Karnparri community
 Kearney Range Community
Kiwirrkurra Community
Koorabye community
Kunawaritji Community
Kundat Djaru Community
Kupartiya Community
Kupungarri Community
Kurnangki community
Kurrawang community
Kutkabubba Community

L
Lamboo Gunian Community
Lombadina
Looma Community
Lundja community

M
 Madunka Ewurry Community
Mallingbar community
Mandangala Community
Mantamaru Community
 Marribank Community
 Marta Marta Community
 Marunbabidi Community
Mindibungu Community
Mingullatharndo Community
 Mingalkala Community
Mirima community
Moongardie Community
Morrell Park community
Mount Margaret Aboriginal Community
Mowanjum Community
 Mowla Bluff Community
Mud Springs Community
Mulan Community
Mulga Queen Community
Muludja Community
 Mungullah Community
Munthamar Community

N
 Nambi Village Community
 Neem Community
Ngalingkadji Community
Ngallagunda Community
Ngumpan Community
Ngunulum Community
Ngurrawaana Community
 Ngurtuwarta Community
 Nicholson Block Community
 Ninga Mia Village Community
 Noonkanbah Community
 Nygah Nygah Community

O
Oombulgurri Community

P
Pandanus Park Community
Papulankutja Community
Parnngurr Community
Parnpajinya community
Patjarr Community
Pia Wadjari Community
Punmu Community
 Punju Njamal Community

R
 Rollah Community

S
Shire of Ngaanyatjarraku
Swan Valley Nyungah Community

T
Tjirrkarli Community
Tjukurla Community
Tjuntjunjtarra Community
 Tkalka Boorda Community

W
Wakathuni Community
 Wanamulnyndong Community
Wanarn Community
Wandanooka community
Wangkatjungka Community
Warakurna Community
Warburton
Warmun Community
Warralong Community
Warrayu community
Weymul Community
Wijilawarrim Community
Wingellina
Wollergerberleng Community
 Wongatha Wonganarra Community
 Woodstock Homestead Community
Woolah Community
Wuggubun Community
 Wungo Community
Wurrenranginy Community

Y
Yakanarra Community
 Yandarinya Community
Yandeyarra Community
Yarrunga Community
Yirrallelm Community
Yiyili Community
 Youngaleena Community
Yulga Jinna Community
Yungngora Community

Notes

External links
 http://www.daa.wa.gov.au/en/Publications/  Department of Aboriginal Affairs publications contain significant amounts of information that relate to the communities in Western Australia.

Aboriginal communities in Western Australia